= Royal Brunei Police Cadet Force =

Youth movement in Brunei Darussalam

- Motto: Disiplin Membentuk Akhlak (Discipline Established Society); Ilmu Pelita Hidup (Knowledge Is Guidance Of Life)

Agency overview
- Formed: 1977
- Volunteers: 1,500+

Jurisdictional structure
- Governing body: Brunei Darussalam

Operational structure
- Headquarters: Ibu Pejabat Pasukan Kadet Polis Diraja Brunei, Pusat Latihan Polis, Jalan Aman, Bandar Seri Begawan
- Agency executive: Insp. Adinin bin Haji Mohammad

The Royal Brunei Police Cadet Corps (Malay: Pasukan Kadet Polis Diraja Brunei) is a youth movement in Brunei Darussalam. The membership requires students or teachers from a secondary public or private schools from Brunei Darussalam, or a volunteer with status as a permanent residents or Bruneian nationality.

As of 2012, the number enrolled reached 1,435 in every public and private school in Brunei Darussalam. The organisation itself is one of the most fastest growing and highest members in Brunei Darussalam. Members' ages ranged from 13 to 60.

== History ==
The organisation was established on 8 March 1977 at Police Training Centre (Pusat Latihan Polis), Jalan Aman, with 90 student members and four students from Sekolah Menengah Jamalul Alam, Sekolah Tinggi Pengiran Raja Isteri and Maktab SOAS.

It was also known during that time as "Pasokan Kedet Polis Di-raja Brunei"

== Activities ==
Their activity often consists marching but they also held a camping trip in recreation park or in the forests once in a year and they hold a marching competition between schools or other youth movements. Twice in three years, they participate in Outward Bound Brunei Darussalam. They also rarely hold shooting sessions.

== Training ==
=== Physical training ===
Every Friday morning, the cadets' training consists of marching. Squad leaders give drill commands to the cadets.

=== Cleaning campaign ===
The cadets frequently hold a cleaning campaign mostly in Muslim cemeteries, schools or recreational parks.

=== Rank promotion ===
The candidates will be sent to a corps training centre. The instructor or drill sergeants teach the candidates to give drill commands or perform march drills. They also have a physical and writing test.

=== Recruitment ===
The new cadets have to learn march drill movements from their seniors and be measured for their uniform clothing.

=== Singapore - Brunei Cadet Exchange Program ===
Since 2013, Brunei and Singapore Police Cadets have had opportunities to meet each other hence boost ties between the two countries. Every year, cadets visit Brunei and learn the country's culture.

== Uniform ==
In 2017, new uniform designs were introduced to replace the grey khaki uniform, with two total uniforms with their own purpose.

=== No 1. uniform ===
Also known as a duty uniform, this uniform quickly replaced the grey khaki uniform. It was first used during 96th Brunei Police Anniversary parade, and was widely used for the first time during 33rd Brunei National Day. The uniform designs are:

- dark blue tops and pants, with pockets
- black beret with 2017 "RBPCF" logo
- black boots with clean polished surface until a person's reflection can be seen
- black belts around the waist
- fabric rank epaulets at top's shoulder with PKP title engraved.

=== Physical training attire ===
The cadets use this attire mostly during marching practice and during sport events or camping. It is a white plain shirt with the corps logo, black sport pants or track suit pants, and sport shoes.

== Ranks ==
Cadets

The ranks that a student can receive as a cadet in their secondary school are as follows:

- Cadet - analogous to Private/Police Constable
- Lance Corporal
- Corporal
- Sergeant
- Staff Sergeant

Instructors & officers

This category of ranks comprises from student volunteers to volunteers, teachers and also staff personnel from the Schools. Ranks are as follows:

- Sergeant major
- Inspector
- Chief Inspector
- Assistant Superintendent of Police
- Deputy Superintendent of Police
